Portugal competed at the 1924 Summer Olympics in Paris, France.

A delegation of thirty competitors (biggest at the time) participated in eight sports, with the equestrian team winning the nation's first ever Olympic medal.

Medalists

Results by event

Athletics
Men's 100m:
 Gentil dos Santos — 1st round (2nd heat)
 Karel Pott — 1st round (8th heat)

Men's 200m:
 Gentil dos Santos — 1st round (10th heat)

Men's Discus Throw:
 António Martins da Silva — 1st round: 12th (32,40m)

Equestrian
Men's Individual Jumping:
 Aníbal de Almeida — 5th (12 faults)
 Hélder de Souza — 12th (19 faults)
 José Mouzinho — 17th (22 faults)
 Luís Cardoso de Menezes — non qualified

Men's Team Jumping:
 António Borges, Hélder de Souza, José Mouzinho (and Luís Cardoso de Menezes) (53 faults) —  Bronze

Fencing
Men's Individual Foil:
 Gil de Andrade — 1/4 finals: 6th (poule 1)
 Manuel Queiróz — 1/4 finals: 6th (poule 2)

Men's Individual Épée:
 António de Menezes — 1st round: (poule 7)
 Ruimondo Mayer — 1/4 finals: 7th (poule 2)
 Mário de Noronha — 1/2 finals: 7th (poule 1)
 Frederico Paredes — 1/4 finals: 8th (poule 1)

Men's Team Épée:
 António Leite, António Mascarenhas de Menezes, Frederico Paredes, Henrique da Silveira, Jorge de Paiva, Mário de Noronha, Paulo d'Eça Leal, and Ruimondo Mayer —  4th

Sailing
Men's Olympic Monotype:
 Frederico Guilherme Burnay — 8th

Shooting
Men's Individual 600m Free Rifle:
 António Ferreira — 57th
 Dario Canas — 62nd
 Francisco António Real — 69th
 Manuel Guerra — 71st

Men's Individual 50m Rifle Prone (60 shots):
 António Martins — 23rd
 António Ferreira — 56th
 Francisco Mendonça — 50th
 Francisco António Real — 62nd

Men's Individual 25m Rapid Fire Pistol (60 shots):
 António Martins — 16th
 António Ferreira — 44th
 A. Duarte Montez — 32nd
 Francisco Mendonça — 17th

Men's Team 400, 600, 800m Free Rifle:
 António Martins, António Ferreira, António Ferreira, Dario Canas, Francisco António Real, Félix Bermudes and Manuel Guerra — 17th (427 points)

Swimming
 Mário da Silva Marques — 1st round: 6th (5th heat)

Tennis
Men's Singles:
 Rodrigo Castro Pereira — 1st round

Weightlifting
Men's Feather Weight (–60 kg):
 A. Pereira — non qualified

Officials
 José Pontes, Nobre Guedes, Salazar Carreira (chiefs of mission)
João Sassetti (fencing)
Gil d'Andrade (fencing)
C. de Mello (weightlifting)

References
Official Olympic Reports
International Olympic Committee results database

Nations at the 1924 Summer Olympics
1924 Summer Olympics
1924 in Portuguese sport